"Turn Me Loose" is a song written by Doc Pomus and  partner, Mort Shuman, upon the request of the managers of  teen idol, Fabian Forte. The song  became Fabian's first hit record, reaching number nine in the Billboard Hot 100 chart in 1959.

Other Versions
It was one of the earliest hits for Pomus and Shuman.
It was recorded in 1973 by David Essex for his début album Rock On.

Footnotes

External links
Songs by Doc Pomus

1959 singles
Songs with music by Mort Shuman
Songs with lyrics by Doc Pomus
1959 songs
Chancellor Records singles